This is a list of the woredas, or districts, in the Southern Nations, Nationalities, and Peoples' Region of Ethiopia, compiled from material on the Central Statistical Agency website.

List of districts by zone

Defunct districts/woredas

Awasa (woreda)
Badawacho
Bena Tsemay
Bench (woreda)
Boreda Abaya
Dita Dermalo
Ezhana Wolene
Gofa Zuria
Goro
Hamer Bena
Isara Tocha
Konteb
Loma Bosa
Mareka Gena
Masha Anderacha
Meinit
Meskanena Mareko
Omo Sheleko
Zala Ubamale

Southern Nations, Nationalities, and Peoples' Region
Districts